The Eagle Point Historic District (also known as Eagle Point Camp) is a U.S. historic district (designated as such on October 3, 1991) located in Venice, Florida. The district is at 759 North Tamiami Trail. It contains 19 historic buildings and 1 structure.

References

External links
 Sarasota County listings at National Register of Historic Places

National Register of Historic Places in Sarasota County, Florida
Historic districts on the National Register of Historic Places in Florida